Suillus serotinus is a species of bolete fungus found in eastern North America. Originally described as a species of Boletus by American botanist Charles Christopher Frost in 1874, it was transferred to Suillus in 1996. The pore surface is initially white before turning reddish brown in age; the angular pores number from 1 to 3 per millimeter. Mushroom flesh slowly stains bluish after injury, later becoming purplish gray then finally reddish brown. The fungus grows in a mycorrhizal association with larch and fruits on the ground scattered or in groups. The spore print is purplish brown; spores are oblong to ellipsoid, smooth, and measure 8–12 by 4–5 µm. The fruit bodies are edible, but lack any distinctive taste or odor.

See also
List of North American boletes

References

External links

serotinus
Fungi of North America
Edible fungi
Fungi described in 1874